George Brothers Building is a historic warehouse located at Chaumont in Jefferson County, New York. It was built in 1899 and is a two-story, three by four bay wood-frame building on a low foundation of coursed limestone. It was built of prefabricated galvanized metal sheathing.

It was listed on the National Register of Historic Places on September 6, 1990.

References

Commercial buildings on the National Register of Historic Places in New York (state)
Commercial buildings completed in 1899
Buildings and structures in Jefferson County, New York
1899 establishments in New York (state)
National Register of Historic Places in Jefferson County, New York